The Vakil Water Storage is an ab anbar (water cistern) that was built in the late 1700s during the Zand dynasty. Karim Khan, the founder of the Zand dynasty made Shiraz his capital. Thus he began to construct new monuments and buildings that were necessary. He began to create a bazaar in his capital, Vakil Bazaar. Then, Karim Khan ordered engineers to build a public bath as there were no baths in homes back in the 1700s. The Vakil Bath constructions were also completed in a short time, but the new capital of Iran needed a better source of fresh water. So his majesty thought about building a water reservoir chamber, an ab anbar. 

Buildings and structures in Shiraz